The men's 3000 metres steeplechase at the 2012 World Junior Championships in Athletics was held at the Estadi Olímpic Lluís Companys on 13 and 15 July.

Medalists

Records
, the existing world junior and championship records were as follows.

Results

Heats
Qualification: The first 4 of each heat (Q) and the 4 fastest times (q) qualified

Final

Participation
According to an unofficial count, 30 athletes from 23 countries participated in the event.

References

External links
WJC12 3000 metres steeplechase schedule

3000 metres
Steeplechase at the World Athletics U20 Championships